Jing Shuping (7 July 1918 – September 14, 2009) was a Chinese businessman who founded the Minsheng Bank, the first privately owned bank to open in the Communist People's Republic of China, in 1996.

Jing Shuping graduated from Saint John's University in Shanghai in 1939.  He was Chairman of the All-China Federation of Industry and Commerce and Vice Chairman of the Chinese People's Political Consultative Conference until 2002, and held the rank of a national leader of China. He also became a director within the China International Trust and Investment Corp, which is now known as the CITIC Group, the Chinese government's state-owned investment group.

Jing founded Minsheng Bank in 1996. He resigned as chairman of the bank in 2006 citing declining health.  However, he remained the honorary chairman of the bank following his retirement.  Additionally, Jing opened China's first law firm, consulting firm and accounting firm since the 1949 Chinese Revolution.

Jing Shuping died on September 14, 2009, in Beijing at the age of 91.

References

1918 births
2009 deaths
Chinese bankers
Businesspeople from Shanghai
People's Republic of China politicians from Shanghai
Members of the Preparatory Committee for the Hong Kong Special Administrative Region
Vice Chairpersons of the National Committee of the Chinese People's Political Consultative Conference
St. John's University, Shanghai alumni
People from Shangyu
China Minsheng Bank people